Harold Mujahid O'Neal FRSA (born 27 March 1981) is an American musician and social entrepreneur, known for his work as a producer, pianist, composer, public speaker, and storyteller. He is widely recognized for his association with the legacy of jazz pianists and has also worked with a diverse range of artists across various musical genres, including  (U2, Kelly Rowland, Bob Geldof, Akon, Melissa Etheridge, Lupe Fiasco, Busta Rhymes, Damien Rice, Estelle Aloe Blacc, Jay Z). 

O'Neal's work has been featured and profiled in numerous publications and programs, including Forbes, NPR's All Things Considered, Fortune, Studio 360, and the 92Y, with The New York Times comparing him to Duke Ellington, Kenny Kirkland, and Maurice Ravel. He is considered to be among the greatest pianists and composers of this generation. 

O'Neal has been awarded fellowship to the Royal Society of the Arts, with Her Majesty Queen Elizabeth II as a patron, and recently played a role as a creative expert for the Academy Award winning Pixar film, Soul.

Early life
Harold O'Neal was born in Arusha, Tanzania, and raised in Kansas City, Missouri. His great-grandfather, Ollie Harold Pennington, was a jazz pianist and composer for silent film in Kansas City, where his grandmother walked to school with Charlie Parker. O'Neal began playing the piano by ear at age four on his father's miniature keyboard. He found his earliest inspirations in the music of Tom and Jerry, Looney Tunes, and Disney. 

Growing up, he spent a considerable amount of time with his grandmother exploring various creative outlets, before eventually becoming a pianist. Having spent much of his youth living in the projects (Public Housing) and surviving near-death experiences, he credits music with saving his life. 

O'Neal attended the Paseo Academy Of Fine And Performing Arts, with classmates Logan Richardson, Lil' Ronnie, and Brian Kennedy, where he studied jazz piano and composition under the mentorship of Ahmad Alaadeen. He studied classical piano and composition with Margie Cameron-Jarrett, whose musical lineage can be traced back to Franz Liszt.

Early Career
O'Neal began his career in music at a young age, touring with at the age of 19 after studying composition at Berklee College of Music. He then went on to attend the Manhattan School of Music, where he studied with Kenny Barron. It was there where he met the renowned American jazz pianist and composer, Andrew Hill, with whom he soon became the apprentice of. and became his apprentice. Hill was himself an apprentice of the prolific composer Paul Hindemith. 

Following Hill's advice, O'Neal left the Manhattan School of Music to replace pianist (musician)|Jason Moran]] in the influential band, the Greg Osby 4. This opportunity led to his major-label debut recording for Blue Note Records at the age of 21. In 2004, O'Neal premiered a jazz quartet featuring Greg Osby, Jeff "Tain" Watts, and Matt Brewer.

Later Career
In the following years, O'Neal released a number of critically acclaimed albums including "Charlie's Suite" (2006), which was a compilation of his family's legacy, "Whirling Mantis" (2010) with a jazz quartet, and a solo piano album "Marvelous Fantasy" (2011) on Smalls Records. He then partnered with Ski Beats and Damon Dash, after being signed to Universal Music Group as a songwriter and producer, to release the albums 24 Hour Karate School 2 (2011), Twilight (2012), and Cam'Ron And Vado's Blu Tops (2012).

In 2012, O'Neal formed a partnership with producers Lil Ronnie and Jerry Wonda, working with many Pop and R&B artists (Miguel, Akon, Melissa Ethridge, Raphael Saadiq, French Montana). In 2013, he released the album "Man on the Street" featuring a jazz quartet as well as solo piano for BluRoc, an at the time incarnation of Rocafella Records distributed by Def Jam Records.

In 2015, O'Neal worked as a composer for a featurette and documentaries of the 2015 Disney film Tomorrowland, produced by Academy Award winning-filmmaker Anthony Giacchino. The film starred George Clooney and Britt Robertson, and was directed by Brad Bird, with the film-score being composed by Michael Giacchino. 

In May 2018, O'Neal released his solo piano album "Piano Cinema," with "Sam and Sam" serving as the lead single. Following the album release, O'Neal completed a spring tour across the U.S. with The Blk Shp, with Pixar as a partner.

Recently, on the recommendation of Pixar co-founder Ed Catmull, O'Neal played a role as a creative expert in the development of Pixar's Soul, working closely with filmmakers Pete Docter, Dana Murray, and Kemp Powers.

Music Direction and Production

In addition to his work as a renowned composer, pianist, and performer, Harold O'Neal has also established himself as a highly respected music director and producer in the entertainment industry. He has demonstrated his expertise in creating and managing music for high-profile events, including Electric Burma with U2, The CNN Heroes All Star Tribute with Anderson Cooper and Kelly Ripa, and The Albie Awards.

The Albie Awards, named in honor of anti-apartheid activist Justice Albie Sachs, was an inaugural awards ceremony organized by The Clooney Foundation, hosted by John Oliver and featuring Aloe Blacc. The event serves to recognize and celebrate courageous defenders of justice, and has featured notable presenters such as Michelle Obama, Julia Roberts, Meryl Streep, Dua Lipa, Nadia Murad, and Oscar Isaac. O'Neal's contributions as a music director and producer for this event further reinforced his reputation as a skilled and accomplished musician.

Social Impact and Future Ventures
As a keynote speaker and Social Entrepreneur, O'Neal has been featured at Google, The World Economic Forum, TEDX, TIME, C2 Montréal, NASA Jet Propulsion Laboratory, and other leading platforms. Currently, he has a multitude of projects in development, including producing his next jazz album (2023), producing and scoring an untitled feature length film with an Academy Award winning director (2024), and founding a global social entrepreneurship initiative with Paul Propster, Chief Strategist and Story Architect of NASA Jet Propulsion Laboratory.

Film and television
In 2009, O'Neal appeared as an actor in Jay Z's music video for the hit record Young Forever, from his multi-platinum album The Blueprint 3. In 2010, he was cast in the HBO television series Boardwalk Empire, portraying James P. Johnson. He was also featured in MTV's Sucker Free.

Credits

Film scoring

Albums

Miscellaneous
 He is the nephew of Pete O'Neal, a former leader of the Black Panther Party
 He holds a black belt in kenpo karate, having spent significant time competing as a full contact kickboxer
 O'Neal's cousin is Emanuel Cleaver, a member of the U.S. House of Representatives
 He is a member of the legendary breakdance crew, the Dynamic Rockers.
 O'Neal is a polymath.

References

External links
 Official Site

1981 births
Living people
American male composers
21st-century American composers
Tanzanian expatriates in the United States
Record producers from Missouri
American male pianists
21st-century American pianists
21st-century American male musicians